5', 3'-nucleotidase, cytosolic, also known as 5'(3')-deoxyribonucleotidase, cytosolic type (cdN) or deoxy-5'-nucleotidase 1 (dNT-1), is an enzyme that in humans is encoded by the NT5C gene on chromosome 17.

This gene encodes a nucleotidase that catalyzes the dephosphorylation of the 5' deoxyribonucleotides (dNTP) and 2'(3')-dNTP and ribonucleotides, but not 5' ribonucleotides. Of the different forms of nucleotidases characterized, this enzyme is unique in its preference for 5'-dNTP. It may be one of the enzymes involved in regulating the size of dNTP pools in cells. Alternatively spliced transcript variants have been found for this gene. [provided by RefSeq, Nov 2011]

Structure

cdN is one of seven 5' nucleotidases identified in humans, all of which differ in tissue specificity, subcellular location, primary structure and substrate specificity. Of the seven, the mitochondrial counterpart of cdN, mdN, is the most closely related to cdN. Their genes, NT5M and NT5C, share the same exon/intron organization, and their amino acid sequences are 52% identical. Both cdN and mdN share nearly identical catalytic phosphate binding sites with most members of the haloacid dehalogenase (HAD) superfamily.

This enzyme forms a 45-kDa homodimer of two 22-kDa subunits composed of a core domain and cap domain. The core domain is an α/β Rossmann-like fold containing six antiparallel β-strands surrounded by α-helixes, and it spans residues 1-17 and 77-201 of the amino acid sequence. The cap domain is a 4-helix bundle spanning residues 18-76. The cleft formed by the core and cap domains acts as the enzyme's active site, where three conserved motifs in the core domain plus the cofactor Mg2+ serve as the substrate binding site. Meanwhile, the residues Phe18, Phe44, Leu45, and Tyr65 in the cap domain form an aromatic, hydrophobic pocket that coordinates with the base of the nucleotide substrate and, thus, influences the enzyme's substrate specificity. Its two main chain amides form hydrogen bonds with the 4-carbonyl group of dUMP and dTMP and with the 6-carbonyl group of dGMP and dIMP, while repelling the 4-amino group of dCMP and dAMP. The residue Asp43 is responsible for donating a proton to O5’ of the nucleotide during catalysis.

Function
This enzyme functions in dephosphorylating nucleoside triphosphates, especially the 5′- and 2′(3′)-phosphates of uracil and thymine, as well as inosine and guanine, dNTPs (dUMPs, dTMPs, dIMPs, and dGMPs, respectively). Due to this function, cdN regulates the size of dNTP pools in cells, in conjunction with the cytosolic thymidine kinases, as part of the dNTP substrate cycle.

The enzyme is ubiquitously expressed, though lymphoid cells display particularly high cdN activity.

Clinical Significance
The protein cdN is essential to counteract accumulation of cellular dNTPs, as excess dNTPs have been linked to genetic disease. In addition, this enzyme's dephosphorylation function could be applied to anticancer and antiviral treatments which use nucleoside analogs. These treatments rely on the kinase activation of the analogs, which then are incorporated into the DNA of the tumor cell or virus to act as DNA chain terminators. cdN can be used to maintain the concentrations of nucleoside analogs at low levels to avoid cytotoxicity.

Moreover, cdN may affect the sensitivity of acute myeloid leukemia (AML) patients to treatment with ara-C. as low cdN mRNA levels in leukemic blasts have been correlated with a worse clinical outcome.

Interactions
cdN binds and dephosphorylates deoxyribonucleotides such as uracil, thymine, inosine, and guanine.

See also 
NT5M

References

Further reading